Cherry Lou Maglasang (born December 30, 1982) is a Filipino actress.

Biography
Born in Ozamiz City to mother Lucile Maglasang and Galileo Maglasang, both notable entrepreneurs in the area, she was the second of four sisters in her family. She started her career as a singer with her sister, Cherrie Gal Maglasang, and created a band, "The Cherries", releasing two albums together "A Taste of Love" and "Higit sa Buhay" in the late 1990s. After her sister got married, she ventured off to another career as an actress in ABS-CBN and became a member of Star Magic. There she met her husband, actor Michael Agassi. Agassi and Lou married in 2007 and had 3 kids. The two separated in 2019. In September 2020, Lou reveals her relationship with actor Phytos Ramirez.

Filmography

Television

Film

Discography

As featured artist

Guest appearances

References

External links

Star Magic
Filipino television actresses
Living people
Actresses from Metro Manila
People from Misamis Occidental
People from Ozamiz
1982 births